Solomon Farai Mire (born 21 August 1989) is a Zimbabwean former cricketer who represented the Zimbabwe cricket team at international level in Tests, One Day Internationals (ODIs) and Twenty20 Internationals (T20Is) before announcing his retirement from international cricket in July 2019. Known for quick scoring, Mire usually opened the batting in ODIs and bowled medium pace. He also played for the Melbourne Renegades in the Australian Big Bash League.

Domestic career
Born in Harare, Zimbabwe, Mire played for the Zimbabwe Under 19s before making his first class debut for Zimbabwean domestic side Centrals in the Logan Cup match against Westerns at Bulawayo on 12 April 2007.

While playing for Darwin club Waratahs in a one-day match in 2013, Mire scored a tournament record 260, from 157 balls with 21 sixes and 13 fours. In November 2013, Mire was signed to Australian Big Bash League team,  Melbourne Renegades for the 2013–14 Big Bash League season.

International career
Mire was included to the Zimbabwean squad for their 2014 tour of Bangladesh, where he made his ODI debut for Zimbabwe on 21 November 2014.

On 30 June 2017, Mire scored his maiden ODI century, which came against Sri Lanka at Galle International Stadium. The century gave Zimbabwe's first ODI victory against Sri Lanka in Sri Lanka. The chased total of 316 was the highest successful chase ever in Sri Lanka and first chase of a total more than 300 in Sri Lanka. Mire was adjudged man of the match for his all-round performance.

In October 2017, he was named in Zimbabwe's Test squad for their series against the West Indies. He made his Test debut for Zimbabwe against the West Indies on 21 October 2017.

He made his Twenty20 International (T20I) debut for Zimbabwe against Afghanistan on 5 February 2018.

In July 2019, the International Cricket Council (ICC) suspended Zimbabwe Cricket, with the team barred from taking part in ICC events. As a result, Mire announced his retirement from international cricket.

References

External links
 

1989 births
Living people
Zimbabwean cricketers
Zimbabwe Test cricketers
Zimbabwe One Day International cricketers
Zimbabwe Twenty20 International cricketers
Sportspeople from Harare
Centrals cricketers
Mid West Rhinos cricketers
Melbourne Renegades cricketers
Cricketers at the 2015 Cricket World Cup
Zimbabwe Select XI cricketers